This is a list of cities and towns in Burkina Faso.

List

 Aribinda
 Bagré
 Banfora
 Batié
 Bobo Dioulasso
 Bogandé
 Bondigui
 Boromo
 Boulsa
 Boussé
 Dano
 Dédougou
 Diapaga
 Diébougou
 Djibo
 Dori
 Fada N'gourma
 Gaoua
 Garango
 Gayéri
 Gorom-Gorom
 Gourcy
 Houndé
 Kampti
 Kantchari
 Kaya
 Kindi
 Kokologo
 Kombissiri
 Kongoussi
 Kordié
 Koudougou
 Kouka, Bam
 Kouka, Banwa
 Koupéla
 Léo
 Loropeni
 Manga
 Méguet
 Mogtedo
 Niangoloko
 Nouna
 Orodara
 Ouagadougou (Capital)
 Ouahigouya
 Ouargaye
 Pama
 Pissila
 Pô
 Pouytenga
 Réo
 Saponé
 Sapouy
 Sebba
 Séguénéga
 Sindou
 Solenzo
 Tangin Dassouri
 Tenkodogo
 Tikaré
 Titao
 Toma
 Tougan
 Villy
 Yako
 Ziniaré
 Zorgo

Largest cities

References

External links

 Association des Municipalités du Burkina Faso (AMBF)
 World Gazetteer

 
Cities
Burkina Faso
Burkina Faso